Events in the year 1988 in Norway.

Incumbents
 Monarch – Olav V
 Prime Minister – Gro Harlem Brundtland (Labour Party)

Events

 May 6 – Widerøe Flight 710, a Dash 7, crashes in Torghatten, Norway in heavy fog, killing all 36 passengers in the worst-ever Dash 7 accident.
 February 23 – Edvard Munch's painting "Vampire" was stolen from the Munch Museum in Oslo.
 July – Seal hunting inspector Odd F. Lindberg submits a highly critical report on the conditions of the hunt. With the national and international attention that follows this becomes arguably the biggest news story in Norway this year.
 August – 4 people are killed in the Farsund shooting.
 August 15 – 15 people are killed in the Måbødalen bus accident.
 August 21 – The Stolen Munch painting "Vampire" is retrieved.
 December 5 – TVNorge, the first advertising-supported Norwegian channel, begins its broadcasting.

Popular culture

Sports
 September 15 – The International Olympic Committee awards the 1994 Winter Olympics in Lillehammer.

Music 

 June 26 – Leonard Cohen concert at Kalvøya, Bærum (Kalvøyafestivalen).

Film

Literature

Notable births
 
 
7 February – Magnus Jøndal, handball player.
7 April – Kristoffer Brun, competitive rower.
12 April – Tone Damli Aaberge, singer.
17 April – Pernille Wibe, team handball player.
18 April – Willfred Nordlund, politician.
23 April – Sandra Borch, politician.
7 May – David Aleksander Sjølie, guitarist 
17 August – Natalie Sandtorv, jazz musician
18 August – Are Strandli, competitive rower.
18 September 
 Magnus Midtbø, rock climber 
 Annette Obrestad, poker player
30 September – David Berget, film director and screenwriter
4 November – Atle Simonsen, politician.
20 November – Veronica Ljosnes, Norwegian circus performer

Full date missing
Siri Ulvestad, orienteering competitor.

Notable deaths

1 January – Rolf Presthus, politician and Minister (born 1936)
9 January – Peter L. Rypdal, Norwegian fiddler and folk music composer (born 1909)
16 January – Inge Einarsen Bartnes, politician (born 1911)
21 January – Jørgen Grave, politician (born 1909)
29 February – Alf Brodal, professor of anatomy (born 1910). 
29 February – Kaare Wahlberg, ski jumper and Olympic bronze medallist (born 1912)
14 March – Johannes Pettersen Løkke, politician (born 1895)
17 March – Leif Granli, politician and Minister (born 1909)
1 April – Nils Thune, politician (born 1898)
17 May – Greta Nissan, actress (born 1906)
27 May – Lars Sæter, politician (born 1895)
29 May – Henry Johansen, international soccer player (born 1904)
8 June – Tollef Landsverk, judge and civil servant (born 1920)
21 June – Sverre Riisnæs, jurist, public prosecutor and collaborator (born 1897)
28 June – Fridtjof Paulsen, speed skater (born 1895)
14 July – Erik Braadland, diplomat and politician (born 1910)
16 July – Ole Myrvoll, professor in economy, politician and Minister (born 1911)
19 July – Erland Asdahl, politician (born 1921)
19 July – Vilhelm Aubert, sociologist (born 1922)
19 August – Johan Møller Warmedal, politician (born 1914)
23 August – Alf Martinsen, soccer player and Olympic bronze medallist (born 1911)
30 September – Sivert Todal, politician (born 1904)
18 October – Aasmund Kulien, politician (born 1893)
20 November – Nils Sønnevik, politician (born 1911)
30 December – Jan Baalsrud, resistance member (born 1917)
31 December – Alfred Thommesen, ship owner and politician (born 1914)

Full date unknown
Gunnar Andersen, ski jumper and World Champion (born 1909)
Per Bratland, newspaper editor (born 1907)
Olav Brunvand, newspaper editor and politician (born 1912)
Odd Eidem, writer, journalist and literary critic (born 1913)
Rolf Jørgen Fuglesang, politician and Minister (born 1909)
Gerd Grieg, actress (born 1895)
Gudmund Harlem, politician and Minister (born 1917)
Oskar Skogly, politician and Minister (born 1908)

See also

References

External links